Ryu Won-woo (born 5 August 1990) is a South Korean footballer who plays as a goalkeeper for Pohang Steelers.

External links 

1990 births
Living people
Sportspeople from Gwangju
South Korean footballers
Association football goalkeepers
Jeonnam Dragons players
Gwangju FC players
Bucheon FC 1995 players
Pohang Steelers players
K League 1 players
K League 2 players